Osman Khalid Butt (born 9 February 1986) is a Pakistani film, television and theatre actor, writer and choreographer. He is best known for his role as Wali Sohaib Khan in Diyar-E-Dil , Faaz Ibrahim in Chupke Chupke and Malik Shahzain in Ehd-e-Wafa . He is the recipient of several accolades, including two Hum Awards and an ARY Film Award, and has been nominated for a Lux Style Award on two occasions.

Butt was first recognised for his leading roles in the fantasy romantic series Aik Nayee Cinderella (2012) and the widely popular comedy drama Aunn Zara (2013). His most notable work includes the successfully acclaimed television series Diyar-e-Dil (2015), Baaghi (2017) and Ehd-e-Wafa (2019), Chupke Chupke (2021), all of which rank among the highest-rated Pakistani dramas, the blockbuster romantic comedy film Balu Mahi (2017), and the drama film Baaji (2019). Butt has written screenplays for the horror thriller Siyaah (2013), and the romantic comedies Janaan (2016) and Parchi (2018).

Biography 
Butt was born on 9 February 1986 in Islamabad, Federal territory, Pakistan, to a Kashmiri father and French mother. His father, Dr. Khalid Said Butt, is an actor, director and screenwriter in Pakistan. According to him, when he was just 5 years old, his elder sister asked him to look at the stars in the sky and craft stories, which then developed into his love for acting and screenwriting. His brother, Omar Khalid Butt, is a news anchor and writer, and his sister, Michelle Tania Butt, is the chief executive of Kuch Khaas.<ref>[https://tribune.com.pk/story/662455/hottie-of-the-week-omar-khalid-butt/ "Hottie of the week: Omar Khalid Butt"], The Express Tribune. Retrieved 7 July 2018.</ref>

Career

Butt started his acting career in 2005, acting in theatre plays in his hometown Islamabad. He made his film debut in the 2007 film Zibahkhana which is Pakistan's first zombie horror film. In 2007 he also wrote, acted, choreographed for, and directed his first theatre production under the banner of ‘The Living Picture Productions’ the company he set up around the same time. He went onto write direct and act in many successful plays in his home town. In 2010 he started making videos on YouTube as "The living picture guy" then acted in the film Slackistan which was banned after the film was refused a pass by the censor board. In 2012 he acted in the romantic drama series Aik Nayee Cinderella. The same year he starred as Aunn in Aunn Zara. He was also featured in a drama Munkir as Zain. In 2015, he played the role of Wali Suhaib Khan in Diyar-e-Dil. In 2016, he played the role of Harib in Sanam. 

Butt is the co-founder, creative lead and poetry editor of the Desi Writers Lounge, an online, 24/7, 365 days a year writers' workshop and community, that aims to showcase new voices in South Asian writing through their biannual publication, 'Papercuts'. He has written the screen play for the 2013 acclaimed supernatural horror film Siyaah and the 2016 commercially successful romantic comedy film Janaan. He is also the script-writer of lux style awards 2017. He then featured as Balu in his debut film  as an actor, the comedy Balu Mahi along with Ainy Jaffri. He was the director of choreography for Hareem Farooq-produced Parchi'' (2018) from the song "Billo Hai".

Filmography

Film

Television

Theatre

Music videos

Awards and nominations

References

External links
 

Living people
Writers from Islamabad
Pakistani male television actors
Pakistani choreographers
Pakistani dramatists and playwrights
Pakistani male film actors
Pakistani male journalists
Pakistani people of Kashmiri descent
Pakistani people of French descent
1986 births
French people of Pakistani descent
National University of Computer and Emerging Sciences alumni